Brotherhood is a Brazilian crime drama web television series that premiered on Netflix on October 25, 2019. On February 22, 2021, the series was renewed for a second series which premiered on May 11, 2022.

Premise
In São Paulo in the mid-1990s, Cristina (Naruna Costa), an honest and devoted lawyer, discovers that her estranged brother Edson (Seu Jorge) is imprisoned and leads a criminal faction known as the "Brotherhood." She is forced by police to become an informant and work against her brother, who has not seen her for years. By infiltrating the Brotherhood in a risky and dangerous mission, she comes into contact with her darkest side and begins to question her own notions of justice.

Cast
 Dion Andias 
 Naruna Costa as Cristina
 Seu Jorge as Edson
 Hermila Guedes as Darlene
 Lee Taylor as Ivan
 Danilo Grangheia as Andrade
 Pedro Wagner as Carniça
 Wesley Guimarães as Marcel
João Humberto Vancini

Episodes

Season 1 (2019)

Season 2 (2022)

Marketing
The first full trailer for the series was released by Netflix on September 19, 2019.

References

External links
 
 

2010s Brazilian television series
2020s Brazilian television series
2019 Brazilian television series debuts
Brazilian crime television series
Brazilian drama television series
Brazilian prison television series
Brazilian thriller television series
Portuguese-language Netflix original programming
Television series set in the 1990s
Television series set in 1994
Television shows filmed in Paraná
Television shows set in São Paulo
Crime drama web series
Prison web series
Works about organized crime in Brazil